Jerry Dawson may refer to:

Jerry Dawson (footballer, born 1888) (1888–1970), English goalkeeper who played for Burnley
Jerry Dawson (footballer, born 1909) (1909–1977), Scottish goalkeeper who played for Rangers and Falkirk